Ben Meier (August 1, 1918 – October 2, 1995) was a North Dakota Republican Party politician who served as the Secretary of State of North Dakota for a record tenure of 34 years from January 1, 1955 to December 31, 1988. This tenure makes him the second longest serving state level Secretary of State in United States history. Bill Gardner of New Hampshire, who has served for 38 years and is still serving as of 2019, surpassed Meier's record on December 9, 2010.

Biography
Ben Meier was born in Napoleon, North Dakota on August 1, 1918. He was educated in Logan County rural schools, and he received his high school education by correspondence. He attended Dakota Business College, and the School of Banking of the University of Wisconsin–Madison. He worked at banks in Napoleon, Gackle, and Hazelton from 1943 until 1950. While working in Hazelton, he was the owner of the bank. He moved to Bismarck in the early 1950s and worked with insurance, banking, and real estate. He also became involved in state politics when he was first elected as the North Dakota Secretary of State in 1954. Until his departure from office on December 31, 1988, he served a total of 34 years in the position which made him the longest serving state official in North Dakota's history. This record was later broken by Bruce Hagen, who served 39 years as a North Dakota Public Service Commissioner. His tenure made him the longest serving state level Secretary of State in United States history.

He was married to Clara Kaczyinski in 1944, who was a teacher. They had two sons; Lynn, who died while a medical student at the University of North Dakota in 1974, and Bernie. Meier died in Bismarck on October 2, 1995 at age 77, and his wife Clara is still residing in Bismarck.

Notes

1918 births
1995 deaths
Secretaries of State of North Dakota
North Dakota Republicans
People from Logan County, North Dakota
University of Wisconsin–Madison alumni
20th-century American politicians